The 1936 season was the seventh completed season of Finnish Football League Championship, known as the Mestaruussarja.

Overview

The 1936 Mestaruussarja  was contested by 8 teams, with HJK Helsinki winning the championship. VPS Vaasa and Drott Pietarsaari were relegated to the second tier which was known as the Suomensarja.

League table

Results

See also
1936 Suomensarja (Tier 2)

Footnotes

References

Mestaruussarja seasons
Fin
Fin
1936 in Finnish football